Jonathan Millieras (born 19 May 1993) is a French professional footballer who plays as a goalkeeper for  club Le Puy.

Club career 
After spending the 2011–12 season as Châteauroux's third goalkeeper, ahead of the 2012–13 season, he was named the starting goalkeeper for the team's opening league match of the campaign against Laval. He subsequently made his professional debut in the match.

On 9 June 2022, Millieras signed with Le Puy.

International career 
Millieras is a France youth international, having represented his nation at under-19 level. He played with the under-19 team at the 2012 UEFA European Under-19 Football Championship.

References

External links 
 
 
 
 

1993 births
Living people
People from Beaumont, Puy-de-Dôme
Sportspeople from Puy-de-Dôme
French footballers
Footballers from Auvergne-Rhône-Alpes
Association football goalkeepers
France youth international footballers
Ligue 2 players
Championnat National players
Championnat National 2 players
Championnat National 3 players
AS Montferrand Football players
LB Châteauroux players
UE Engordany players
Moulins Yzeure Foot players
Le Puy Foot 43 Auvergne players